The 4th Annual Tony Awards were held on April 9, 1950, at the Waldorf-Astoria Grand Ballroom in New York City, and broadcast on radio station WOR and the Mutual Network. The host was James Sauter.

Ceremony
Presenters were Helen Hayes (president of the American Theatre Wing) and Mrs. Martin Beck (chairman of the board), with a special presentation by Eleanor Roosevelt.

Performers were Yvonne Adair, Rod Alexander, John Conte, Richard Eastham, Adolph Green, Georges Guétary, Bambi Linn, Allyn McLerie, Lucy Monroe, Danny Scholl, Herb Shriner, William Tabbert, William Warfield, Lou Wills Jr., Julie Wilson, and Martha Wright.

Award winners
Source:The New York Times

Note: nominees are not shown

Production

Performance

Craft

Special awards
 Maurice Evans, for work he did in guiding the City Center Theatre Company through a highly successful season
Eleanor Roosevelt presented a special award to volunteer worker Philip Faversham of the American Theatre Wing's hospital program
 Brock Pemberton, founder of Tony Awards and its original chairman (posthumous)
 Stage Technician, Joe Lynn, master propertyman (Miss Liberty)

Multiple nominations and awards

The following productions received multiple awards.

9 wins: South Pacific
2 wins: Come Back, Little Sheba and Regina

References

External links
Official Site
Infoplease listing

Tony Awards ceremonies
1950 in theatre
1950 awards
1950 in the United States
Tony